Alexa Conners (born February 15, 1991) is an American mixed martial artist and competes in Bantamweight division. She formerly competed for Invicta Fighting Championships .

Background 
Alexa was born in Winchester, Virginia, United States.  she worked in engineering industry as a sales person prior fully committed to MMA professionally.

Mixed martial arts career

Invicta Fighting Championships 
Conners made her promotional debut on May 7, 2016 at Invicta FC 17: Evinger vs. Schneider against Laura Howarth .

Her next fight was on November 18, 2016 at Invicta FC 20: Evinger vs. Kunitskaya against Stephanie Egger  and she won the fight via a split decision.

Beatdown and LFA  
On March 18, 2017, Spencer faced Mariah Prussia at Beatdown 20. She won the fight via technical knock out on round one.

Conner faced Calie Cutleron April 7, 2017 at LFA 8. She won the fight via unanimous decision.

Return to Invicta Fighting Championships 
Conners returned to Invicta and faced Katharina Lehner  on August 31, 2017 at Invicta FC 25: Kunitskaya vs. Pa'aluhi.  She lost the fight via a technical knock out.

Conners faced Julia Avila on November 16, 2018 at Invicta FC 32: Spencer vs. Sorenson.  She lost the fight via technical knockout in round two.

Conners faced Mariya Agapova on September 6, 2019  at Invicta FC: Phoenix Series 2. She won the fight via a submission in round one.

Personal life 
Conners' father, who suffered from mental illness killed his girl friend and took his own life. The event effected Conners deeply and she uses fighting as the platform to spread mental illness awareness and provide support for those who need help.

Mixed martial arts record 

|-
| Loss
| align=center| 5–4
| Mariya Agapova
| Submission (rear-naked choke)
| Invicta FC Phoenix Series 2
| 
| align=center| 1
| align=center| 3:03
| Kansas City, Kansas, United States
|
|-
| Loss
| align=center| 5–3
| Julia Avila
| TKO (front kick and punches)
| Invicta FC 32: Spencer vs. Sorenson
| 
| align=center| 2
| align=center| 4:43
| Shawnee, Oklahoma, United States
|-
| Win
| align=center| 5–2
| Carina Damm
| TKO (punches)
| Beatdown 21
| 
| align=center| 3
| align=center| 4:27
| New Town, North Dakota, United States
|-
| Loss
| align=center| 4–2
| Katharina Lehner
| TKO (punches)
| Invicta FC 25: Kunitskaya vs. Pa'aluhi
| 
| align=center| 1
| align=center| 4:21
| Lemoore, California, United States
|
|-
| Win
| align=center| 4–1
| Calie Cutler
| Decision (unanimous)
| LFA 8
| 
| align=center| 3
| align=center| 5:00
| Greenville, South Carolina, United States
|
|-
| Win
| align=center| 3–1
| Mariah Prussia
| TKO (punches)
| Beatdown 20
| 
| align=center| 1
| align=center| 4:14
| New Town, North Dakota, United States
|
|-
| Win
| align=center| 2–1
| Anna DeCrescente
| Decision (unanimous)
| NFC 90
| 
| align=center| 3
| align=center| 5:00
| Kennesaw, Georgia, United States
|-
| Win
| align=center| 1–1
| Stephanie Egger
| Decision (split)
| Invicta FC 20: Evinger vs. Kunitskaya
| 
| align=center| 3
| align=center| 5:00
| Kansas City, Missouri, United States
|-
| Loss
| align=center| 0–1
| Laura Howarth
| Decision (split)
| Invicta FC 17: Evinger vs. Schneider
| 
| align=center| 3
| align=center| 5:00
| Costa Mesa, California, United States
|-

See also 
 List of female mixed martial artists

References

External links 
 
 Alexa Conners at Invicta FC

Living people
1991 births
Sportspeople from Virginia
American female mixed martial artists
Bantamweight mixed martial artists
Mixed martial artists utilizing Brazilian jiu-jitsu
American practitioners of Brazilian jiu-jitsu
Mixed martial artists from Virginia
21st-century American women